The 1979 NCAA Division I Wrestling Championships were the 49th NCAA Division I Wrestling Championships to be held. Iowa State University in Ames, Iowa hosted the tournament at the Hilton Coliseum.

Iowa took home the team championship with 122.5 points with two individual champions.

Bruce Kinseth of Iowa received the Gorriaran Award as well as being named the Most Outstanding Wrestler.

Team results

Individual finals

References

NCAA Division I Wrestling Championship
NCAA
Wrestling competitions in the United States
NCAA Division I  Wrestling Championships
NCAA Division I  Wrestling Championships
NCAA Division I  Wrestling Championships